Diego Armando Maradona Sinagra (born 20 September 1986) is an Italian  football coach, former player, and professional beach soccer player. He is the son of Cristiana Sinagra and Argentine national footballer Diego Maradona.

He is currently the head coach of Eccellenza Campania club Napoli United.

Biography
Born in Naples, Italy, Sinagra – nicknamed Diego Jr. or Dieguito – was the result of an out-of-wedlock affair between Maradona and a young local woman named Cristiana Sinagra. He was brought up by his mother. His paternal grandfather Diego Maradona Senior "Chitoro" (1927–2015), who worked at a chemicals factory, was of Indigenous Guaraní and Spanish descent, and his paternal grandmother Dalma Salvadora Franco, "Doña Tota" (1930–2011), had Italian and Croatian ancestry.

Sinagra had a passion for football and started playing at a young age showing promise by emulating the skills of his father. At 11 he was a part of the Napoli youth squad. He represented Italy at under-17 level. In 2004, the young Sinagra joined the youth squad of Genoa for a season.

An Italian court recognized Maradona's paternity in 1993, but Sinagra met his father for the first time in 2003, during a golf tournament in Fiuggi. It was only in 2007 that Maradona recognised Sinagra as his son according to the Italian press.

There were rumours that Pope Francis, at that time the Archbishop of Buenos Aires, asked Maradona to recognize Sinagra as his son. Maradona's lawyers have denied this allegation.

On 10 June 2015, Sinagra married Nunzia Pennino in a Roman Catholic church in Naples and received Pope Francis' blessing.

On 25 August 2016, Maradona publicly recognised Sinagra as his son in Argentina and declared in front of the media in Buenos Aires "I love him a lot and he’s very like me."

Playing in Eccellenza and in Serie D
Sinagra's start in first team football came in the amateur leagues during 2005 when he joined Cervia, a team in the Eccellenza division of Emilia-Romagna, which was the subject of a national football reality show, named Campioni - Il sogno (Champions - The Dream).

He joined Internapoli, from Eccellenza Campania, in January 2006; after having been without a team for the first half of the 2005–06 season, he only played two games for the club as he suffered an injury which kept him sidelined. In 2007, he joined  Quarto, another club in the Campanian Eccellenza; Quarto were victorious in the Eccellenza playoffs that season and were promoted to Serie D. He then agreed to stay at Quarto for the 2007–08 Serie D season, but left the club by mutual consent on 16 November 2007 following a head coach replacement which caused him concerns about his role in the team. He then signed for Venafro, a Molisan Serie D team, a few weeks later. On 21 January 2008, Sinagra scored the first goal with Venafro from 30 metres. At the end of the season Sinagra left Venafro and he was bought by a beach soccer team, A.S.D. Mare di Roma.

On 2 December 2008, he signed for F.C America – (Eccellenza Campania). In August 2009 he then signed for Juve Stabia, but on 11 September 2009 he left the team. He then played for U.S. Arzanese.

European Beach Soccer
On 29 April 2008, Sinagra joined the Italy national beach soccer team for the FIFA Beach Soccer World Cup qualification which was held from 11 to 18 May in Spain. On 12 May, he made his debut in the national team in the match against Greece. Sinagra played four matches in the Beach Soccer World Cup's qualification and eventually placed Italy fourth, qualifying for the World Cup. In June 2008, he left Venafro and he was bought by a beach soccer team, A.S.D. Mare di Roma. He made his debut in Beach Soccer's Serie A on 27 June 2008 in the match against Alma Juventus Fano, scoring a goal. He scored six goals in three matches for Mare di Roma, convincing Italy's coach Giancarlo Magrini to include him in the squad for the 2008 FIFA Beach Soccer World Cup.

Italy eventually placed second in the World Cup, losing 5–3 in the final against Brazil. Sinagra scored two goals for Italy in the competition, including one in the final. In the championship he scored a dozen goals, allowing his team, Mare di Roma, to advance to the final phase of competition for the Italian title. Mare di Roma was however eliminated in the quarter-finals.

In 2009, Sinagra was bought by Napoli Beach Soccer. He scored eight goals, allowing his team to win the Italian beach soccer championship for the first time in its history.

Coaching career
In July 2021, he took on his first head coaching job as manager of Eccellenza amateurs Napoli United, a former team of his as a player (as Afro Napoli United).

Honours
Eccellenza Playoff Winner: 2006–07
FIFA Beach Soccer World Cup runner-up: 2008

References

External links

1986 births
Living people
Italian sportspeople of Argentine descent
Italian people of Guaraní descent
Italian people of Basque descent
Footballers from Naples
Italian footballers
Italy youth international footballers
Italian beach soccer players
Italian Roman Catholics
Association football forwards
Maradona family
Serie D players
Participants in Argentine reality television series
Bailando por un Sueño (Argentine TV series) participants